Lisa Robertson (born July 22, 1961) is a Canadian poet, essayist and translator. She lives in France.

Life and work
Born in Toronto, Ontario, Robertson moved to British Columbia in 1979, first living on Saltspring Island, then in Vancouver, where she began to publish and work collectively in a community of poets and artists. During the 90s, she was a member of The Kootenay School of Writing, which was a writer-run collective, and Artspeak Gallery. From 1988 to 1994 she ran Proprioception Books, a bookstore in downtown Vancouver specializing in poetry, theory and criticism, where she also hosted readings. Her first book was a chapbook, The Apothecary, published by Tsunami Editions in 1991. Since then she has published nine books of poetry, three books of essays, and a novel.

Robertson studied English literature and art history as a mature student at Simon Fraser University (1984–1988) before leaving the university without a degree to become an independent bookseller (1988–1994). Since 1995 she has been a freelance writer and teacher, occasionally working as a writer in residence or visiting professor in various universities in Canada, the USA and the UK. Her first such position was as Judith E. Wilson Visiting Fellow in Poetry, at Cambridge University in 1999. During that time she completed the research that resulted in her book The Weather (2001), which has since been translated to French and Swedish. Her many essays on the contemporary visual arts, published in gallery and museum catalogues since the mid-1990s, are collected in her 2003 book Occasional Works and Seven Walks from the Office for Soft Architecture. Anemones: A Simone Weil Project, her 2021 book, contains Robertson's translations of Simone Weil's 1941 essay "What the Occitan Inspiration Consists Of" and the 12th C poem "Lark" by Bernart de Ventadorn, as well as extensive annotations, an introductory essay,  and archival material.

In 2006, Robertson was a judge of the Griffin Poetry Prize and Holloway poet-in-residence at UC Berkeley. From 2007 to 2010 she taught at California College of the Arts in San Francisco. In Fall 2010 she was writer-in-residence at Simon Fraser University in Vancouver.  In Spring 2014 she was the Bain Swigget lecturer in Poetry at Princeton University. In 2017 she was awarded an honorary doctorate of letters by Emily Carr University of Art and Design in Vancouver, and in 2018 she received the Foundation for Contemporary Arts C.D. Wright Award. Her literary archive is housed at Simon Fraser University Library's Special Collections.

Her first novel, The Baudelaire Fractal, was published by Coach House Books in January 2020. It was a finalist for the ReLit Award for fiction in 2021, and for the Governor General's Award for English-language fiction at the 2020 Governor General's Awards.

Selected bibliography
 The Apothecary (Vancouver, BC: Tsunami, 1991; reissued 2001; reissued 2007 by BookThug)
 The Barscheit Horse with Catriona Strang and Christine Stewart (Hamilton, Ontario: Berkeley Horse, 1993)
 XEclogue II-V (Vancouver: Sprang Texts, 1993)
 XEclogue (Vancouver: Tsunami Editions, 1993; reissued by New Star Books, 1999)
 The Glove: An Essay on Interpretation (Vancouver: UBC Fine Arts Gallery, 1993)
 The Badge (Hamilton, Ontario: The Berkeley Horse/Mindware, 1994)
 Earth Monies (Mission, BC: DARD, 1995)
 The Descent (Buffalo, NY: Meow, 1996)
 Debbie: An Epic (Vancouver: New Star Books, 1997; UK: Reality Street, 1997)
 Soft Architecture: A Manifesto (Vancouver: Artspeak Gallery, 1999)
 The Weather (Vancouver: New Star Books, 2001; UK: Reality Street, 2001)
 French edition: Le Temps, translated by Éric Suchère (Caen: Éditions Nous, 2016)
 Swedish edition: Vädret, translated by Niclas Nilsson (Malmö: Rámus, 2017)
 A Hotel (Vancouver: Vancouver Film School, 2003)
 Occasional Work and Seven Walks from the Office for Soft Architecture (Astoria, OR: Clear Cut Press, 2003)
 Face/ (New York: A Rest Press, 2003)
 Rousseau's Boat (Vancouver, BC: Nomados, 2004)
 First Spontaneous Horizontal Restaurant. Belladonna 75. (Brooklyn: Belladonna Books, 2005)
 The Men: A Lyric Book (Toronto: BookThug, 2006)
 Lisa Robertson's Magenta Soul Whip (Toronto: Coach House Press, 2009)
 R's Boat (Berkeley: University of California Press, 2010)
 Nilling: Prose (Toronto: BookThug, 2012)
 Cinema Of the Present (Toronto: Coach House Press, 2014)
 3 Summers (Toronto: Coach House Press, 2016)
 Starlings (San Francisco: Krupskaya, 2018)
 Proverbs of a She-Dandy (Paris/Vancouver: Libraries Editeurs, 2018)
 Thresholds: A Prosody of Citizenship (London: Bookworks, 2019)
 The Baudelaire Fractal (Toronto: Coach House Press, 2020)
Anemones: A Simone Weil Project (Amsterdam: If I Can't Dance, 2021)

Selected essays
 "Coasting" with Jeff Derksen, Nancy Shaw, and Catriona Strang. Telling it Slant: Avant Garde Poetics of the 1990s. Ed. Mark Wallace. (Tuscaloosa: Alabama UP, 2002)
 "The Weather: A Report on Sincerity," from DC Poetry Anthology 2001.
 "How Pastoral: A Manifesto." A Poetics of Criticism. Ed. Juliana Spahr. (Buffalo: Leave Books, 1994)
 "My Eighteeneth Century." Assembling Alternatives. Ed. Romana Huk. (Middletown, CT: Wesleyan UP, 2003)
 "On Palinode." Chicago Review 51:4/52:1 (2006)

See also

Canadian literature
Canadian poetry
List of Canadian poets

References

1961 births
Living people
Canadian women poets
Canadian feminist writers
Roberta C. Holloway Lecturer in the Practice of Poetry
Writers from Toronto
20th-century Canadian poets
21st-century Canadian poets
20th-century Canadian women writers
21st-century Canadian women writers
21st-century Canadian novelists
Canadian women novelists